The Bartlett Historic District is a historic district in Bartlett, Texas, that is listed on the National Register of Historic Places. The district consists of a two block area of early 20th century commercial row buildings centered along E. Clark Street and is bounded on the east by State Highway 95 and on the west by railroad tracks. Evie Street dissects the district, and the boundaries extend one block north and one half block south along Evie to include virtually all of Bartlett's commercial buildings.

The Bartlett Historic District stands as a cohesive grouping of early 1900s commercial buildings and reflects the town's prosperity achieved during the early 20th century as a cotton shipping center in central Texas. Presenting a remarkably intact main street, the district includes the core of the city's past and present commercial activities within a well-defined boundary. Particularly noteworthy is the high percentage of contributing structures within the district—88%. Although many of the buildings remain in fair condition, few have been significantly altered.

See also

National Register of Historic Places listings in Bell County, Texas
National Register of Historic Places listings in Williamson County, Texas
Recorded Texas Historic Landmarks in Bell County
Recorded Texas Historic Landmarks in Williamson County

References

External links
 BARTLETT, TEXAS est. 1881

Historic districts on the National Register of Historic Places in Texas
Geography of Williamson County, Texas
National Register of Historic Places in Bell County, Texas
National Register of Historic Places in Williamson County, Texas